Thomas Bickel (born 6 October 1963) is chief scout for FC Zürich and a former Swiss national football team midfielder.

He was capped 52 times including three games at the 1994 FIFA World Cup and scored five goals for the Switzerland national team between 1986 and 1995.

Working mostly as an entrepreneur in gastronomy after his career, he returned to football for good in 2013 as head of scouting at FC Zürich where he had started his professional career as a player in 1985. From 2016 to 2020 he was part of the club management as head of the sport department. Subsequently he returned to his former role as head of scouting.

Career statistics

Club

International

References

External links

1963 births
Living people
People from Aarberg
Swiss men's footballers
Association football midfielders
Switzerland international footballers
1994 FIFA World Cup players
Swiss Super League players
J1 League players
Japan Football League (1992–1998) players
Grasshopper Club Zürich players
Vissel Kobe players
FC Zürich players
Swiss Challenge League players
Swiss expatriate footballers
Swiss expatriate sportspeople in Japan
Expatriate footballers in Japan
Sportspeople from the canton of Bern